Léon Schumacher (5 July 1918 – 29 December 1985) was a Luxembourgian footballer. He played in twelve matches for the Luxembourg national football team from 1946 to 1948. He was also part of Luxembourg's squad for the football tournament at the 1948 Summer Olympics, but he did not play in any matches.

References

External links
 
 

1918 births
1985 deaths
Luxembourgian footballers
Luxembourg international footballers
People from Grevenmacher (canton)
Association football midfielders